Roger Chupin (3 September 1921 – 12 November 2002) was a French racing cyclist. He rode in the 1948 Tour de France.

References

External links

1921 births
2002 deaths
French male cyclists